Ferenc Pfaff (born as Franz Pfaff, Mohács, 19 November 1851 – Budapest, 21 August 1913) was a Hungarian architect and academic.

Career

Pfaff received his degree in 1880 after studying under Imre Steindl at the József Nádor Technical University in Budapest. Early in his career, he designed a number of smaller buildings, among which is the Roman Catholic church at Svábhegy.

However, he is best known for his career as an architect with the Hungarian Railways. Joining in 1887, he later became director of building works right across the Hungarian lands within the Austro-Hungarian Empire. In the following two decades he would design some 20 large, and numerous smaller railway stations, mainly in the Renaissance eclectic style. These buildings were often modest but notable for their fine sense of proportion and scale. He also redesigned a number of existing stations, notably in Croatia (Zagreb and Rijeka) and in Hungary (Győr, Kassa and Miskolc).

Railway stations

 Arad
 Bratislava main railway station, 1905
 Carei
 Celldömölk
 Cluj-Napoca
 Chop
 Debrecen
 Füzesabony, 1893
 Gyimesbükk (Ghimeș-Făget)
 Győr (remodelling)
 Jimbolia
 Kaposvár
 Karlovac
 Košice (remodelling)
 Leopoldov
 Miskolc Gömöri railway station, 1899
 Miskolc Tiszai railway station, 1901 (remodelled)
 Osijek
 Pécs, (1900)
 Rijeka, 1890
 Satu Mare, 1899
 Szeged, 1902 – restored in 2006 according to his original plans
 Timișoara Iosefin, 1897
 Vršac
 Zagreb Glavni railway station

Other buildings
 Szeged, MAV Directorship, 1894
 Budapest, Transport Museum, 1896
 Budapest, Svabhegyi Roman Catholic church, 1886
 Budapest, Stefania Palace, home to 1885 national art exhibition, then until 1945 City Museum
 Budapest, Exhibition hall

References

 
Railway architects
1851 births
1913 deaths
People from Mohács
Hungarian architects
Danube-Swabian people
Budapest University of Technology and Economics alumni